Holocacista rivillei is a species of moth of the family Heliozelidae. It is found in southern Europe and western and Central Asia. Records include Spain, France, Italy, Malta, Slovenia, Croatia, Bulgaria, Greece, Sicily, Turkey, south-eastern Russia, Georgia, Kazakhstan, Uzbekistan and Turkmenistan.

The larvae feed on Vitis vinifera. They mine the leaves of their host plant. The mine starts as a relatively long, slender gallery. Later, the mine becomes a small blotch with small cut-outs. Pupation takes place in a cocoon which is often attached to the stems or leaves of the host plant.

References

Moths described in 1855
Heliozelidae
Moths of Europe